Châtellerault (Poitevin-Saintongeais: Châteulrô/Chateleràud) is a commune in the Vienne department in the Nouvelle-Aquitaine region in France. It is located in the northeast of the former province Poitou, and the residents are called Châtelleraudais.

Geography
Châtellerault lies on the river Vienne, a few km downstream from its confluence with the Clain in Cenon-sur-Vienne.

History
Châtellerault was an important stronghold on the northern march of Poitou, established by the Count of Poitiers to secure his borders in the early 10th century. The count's local representative, the Vicomte de Châtellerault was established as a hereditary appointment by the time of Airaud who was probably a kinsman of the counts of Auvergne and dukes of Aquitaine; his heirs were vicomtes (viscounts) until the mid-11th century.

The daughter of Aymeric I, Ænor of Châtellerault (c. 1103 – c. 1130),  whose mother had been the "mistress" in the new courtly love poetry of the troubadour lord William, sixth Count of Poitiers and ninth Duke of Aquitaine, who lodged in his tower the "Dangereuse de Châtellerault", married his son, William X of Aquitaine, and was mother of Eleanor of Aquitaine.

The title, Vicomte de Châtellerault, passed in turn to each of three great French noble families: La Rochefoucauld, Lusignan and, from the thirteenth century until the French Revolution, to the family of Harcourt.

However, in return for services offered to the Crowns of Scotland and France, the title of Duc de Châtellerault (1548) was presented to James Hamilton, 2nd Earl of Arran, Chief of the Name, and regent of Scotland during the infancy of Mary, Queen of Scots, and of France. This title, though now without any benefices, remains in contention between the heir male and the heir general of Arran, respectively the Duke of Abercorn and the Duke of Hamilton. (See Chatelherault Country Park, Lanarkshire.)

Population

Economy
From medieval times, Châtellerault was known for its cutlery and swordmaking industry, and in 1816 the commune became a center for arms manufacture for the French government. The Manufacture d'armes de Châtellerault was one of France's four principal state-owned arms manufacturers, providing most of the infantry small arms used by the French Army and Navy. MAC was created in 1819, and operated continually until it was closed as a weapon manufacturing facility in 1968. It saw the creation in 1886, and later the mass production, of the Lebel rifle which was the main French infantry weapon used during the First World War (1914–1918). It also was the source of the first 500,000 production Model 1891 Mosin–Nagant rifles, as the Russian armament industry could not tool up quickly enough to produce them for the rearmament of the Imperial Russian Army.

The facility has now been transformed into the central repository (Centre des Archives de l'Armement et du Personnel) of all the French military archives related to armament matters.  Archived and declassified MAC records are open to bona fide scholars and researchers upon written request.

Personalities

Births
Châtellerault was the birthplace of:
 Aénor de Châtellerault (1103–1130), Duchess of Aquitaine
 Clément Janequin (c. 1485–1558), composer of the Renaissance
 Jean Daillé (1594–1670), French Huguenot and Calvinist theologian
 Charles Sabourin (1849–1920), pulmonologist
 Gilbert Chinard (1881–1972), author, historian 
 Rodolphe Salis (1851–1897), creator, host and owner of Le Chat Noir ("The Black Cat")  
 Marie-Louise Carven (1909–2015), Fashion Designer, Recipient of the Highest French Civilion Honor, Commander of the Legion of Honor
 Bernard Panafieu (born 1931), archbishop of Marseille and Cardinal Priest of the Roman Catholic Church
 Benoît Cauet (born 1969), former footballer
 Sylvain Chavanel (born 1979) and Sébastien Chavanel (born 1981), professional cyclists

Notable residents
 Édith Cresson (born 1934), French politician
 Jean-Pierre Thiollet (born 1956), writer

Twin towns – sister cities
Châtellerault is twinned with:

 Velbert, Germany, since 1965
 Kaya, Burkina Faso, since 1976
 Corby, England, United Kingdom, since 1979
 Bouctouche, Kent County, New Brunswick, Canada, since 1984
 Castellón de la Plana, Spain, since 1987
 Hamilton, Scotland, United Kingdom, since 1993
 Piła, Poland, since 1994

See also
Poitevin language
Communes of the Vienne department

References

External links

 City council website (in French)
 Tourist office website
 Office Tourisme Chatellerault
 Brief history of the manufacture de Chatellerault
  Aerial views

Communes of Vienne
Subprefectures in France
Poitou